The women's freestyle 76 kg freestyle wrestling competition at the 2018 Commonwealth Games in Gold Coast, Australia was held on 12 April at the Carrara Sports and Leisure Centre.

Results
F — Won by fall

Main Bracket

Repechage

References

Wrestling at the 2018 Commonwealth Games
Com